Walter P. Lewis (June 10, 1866 – January 30, 1932) was an American actor of the silent era. He appeared in 55 films between 1912 and 1931. He was born in Albany, New York.

Partial filmography

 My Hero (1912)
 Brutality (1912)
 My Baby (1912)
 Gold and Glitter (1912)
 Heredity (1912)
 The Musketeers of Pig Alley (1912)
 The New York Hat (1912)
 The Painted Lady (1912)
 The Chief's Blanket (1912)
 Blind Love (1912)
 Love in an Apartment Hotel (1913)
 Brothers (1913)
 A Misappropriated Turkey (1913)
 Fate (1913)
 An Adventure in the Autumn Woods (1913)
 The Telephone Girl and the Lady (1913)
 Three Friends (1913)
 The Tender Hearted Boy (1913)
 The Eternal Sapho (1916)
 The Seven Pearls (1917)
 The Avenging Trail (1917)
 To Hell with the Kaiser! (1918)
 Uncle Tom's Cabin (1918)
 Out of a Clear Sky (1918)
 The White Moll (1920)
The Birth of a Soul (1920)
 The Ghost in the Garret (1921)
 Tol'able David (1921)
The Family Closet (1921)
 Lonesome Corners (1922)
 The Steadfast Heart (1923)
 Three Miles Out (1924)
 The Green Archer (1925)
 Down Upon the Suwanee River (1925)
 The Crimson Flash (1927)
 On Guard (1927)
 The Little Shepherd of Kingdom Come (1928)
 Beware of Blondes (1928)

References

External links

1866 births
1932 deaths
American male film actors
American male silent film actors
20th-century American male actors